Akamatsu (written:  lit. "red pine") is a Japanese surname. Notable people with the surname include:

Akamatsu clan
, Japanese daimyō
, Japanese samurai
, Japanese samurai
, Japanese samurai
Akamatsu Tōshōin, Japanese daimyō
, Japanese politician
, Japanese manga artist
, Japanese politician
, Japanese baseball player
Naoki Akamatsu, guitarist in Hysteric Blue
Ryōko Akamatsu (born 1929), Japanese politician
, Japanese naval aviator and World War II flying ace

Fictional characters
, a character in the video game Danganronpa V3: Killing Harmony

Japanese-language surnames